Anoop Dhanak is an Indian politician. He was elected to the Haryana Legislative Assembly from Uklana in the 2014 and 2019 as a member of the Indian National Lok Dal.

He was one of the four MLAs who joined the Dushyant Chautala's Jannayak Janta Party after a split in Indian National Lok Dal. He was named as minister of Independent Charge for Archaeology and Museums and Labour and Employment in Second Manohar Lal Khattar ministry from 2019.

References 

1973 births
Living people
Jannayak Janta Party politicians
People from Hisar (city)
Haryana MLAs 2014–2019
Haryana MLAs 2019–2024
State cabinet ministers of Haryana